Bass Drum of Death is an American garage punk band from Oxford, Mississippi, United States, currently signed to Fat Possum Records.

History
The band's frontman, John Barrett, formed Bass Drum of Death in 2008 as a one-man-band, playing both his bass drum and guitar. Although the band's members are from Oxford, Mississippi, they quickly became unmotivated by the lack of a music scene and decided it would be best to start in New York City.  The touring band consists of two guitarists and a drummer. Barrett recorded their first two albums by himself. Their debut LP, GB City, was released on April 12, 2011 by Fat Possum Records. Inflated Records also distributed the vinyl edition. In April 2011, Bass Drum of Death performed live on Fuel TV with MellowHype, of OFWGKTA, playing the song "64". Their song, "Get Found", has been aired on Triple J, an Australian alternative music radio station and the group played the station's 2012 New Beginning's Festival. In addition, Bass Drum of Death has performed at the Rock en Seine Festival in France.

From the time of their inception, Bass Drum of Death has toured the United States and Europe extensively. In August 2014, the band performed in Brazil for the first time.

In early 2013, the band was signed to Innovative Leisure Records. In two consecutive years, they released two full-length albums. On June 25, 2013, they released an eponymous album and, on October 7, 2014, they released Rip This, which featured drummer Len Clark as a new collaborative band member.

In May 2015, John Barrett announced through the band's social media accounts, that Bass Drum of Death would be going on a hiatus citing "personal issues", canceling their scheduled summer tour of Europe in the process. On September 5, 2015, the band returned playing the Made in America festival in Philadelphia, which was also seen on a webcast.

On November 3, 2017, Barrett, announced on Twitter that he had finished their fourth album and was released in 2018 as Just Business. The group followed that album with a 7-inch single, "Too Cold to Hold" / "Wait", released on Muscle Beach Records. It featured Bass Drum of Death founder and frontman John Barrett collaborating with his younger brother, Jim Barrett. The pair started writing songs in Brooklyn in early 2020 and finished recording in Oxford, Mississippi during the COVID-19 lockdown. The band also readied a full-length album.

On September 14, 2022, the band announced their fifth studio album Say I Won't, along with the release of the single "Say Your Prayers". The album marked the band's return to Fat Possum Records and was released on January 27, 2023. A second single, "Find It" was released on October 19, 2022.

In other media
 Their song "Velvet Itch", off GB City, was heard in the 2012 movie Ghost Rider: Spirit of Vengeance.
 Their song "Get Found" Is a featured track on MLB 2K12.
 Their song "Nerve Jamming" was used in an episode of BBC's Waterloo Road.
 Their song "Way Out" was used in an episode of The CW's The Vampire Diaries.
 Other songs have been featured in ads for H&M clothing and NASCAR.  
 The soundtrack for the video game Forza Horizon 2 features "Crawling After You", "Electric", "Lose My Mind", and "Everything's the Same".
 The soundtrack for the video game Grand Theft Auto V features "Crawling After You".
 Their song "I Wanna Be Forgotten" was used in Thrasher Magazine's "King Of The Road".
 Their song "I Wanna Be Forgotten" was used during the credits of the video game Sunset Overdrive.
 The songs "I'm On The Run", "Between The Lines" and "Smell The Night" were recorded for Sunset Overdrive. They also licensed "I Wanna Be Forgotten" for the game's score.
 Their song "Nerve Jamming" was used during a television advertisement for men's clothing company Jacamo.
 Their song "Left For Dead" was used in the 2017 movie Fist Fight.
 The soundtrack for the video game Forza Horizon 4 features "I Don't Wanna Know".
 The song "Just Business" can be heard during an episode of Altered Carbon.

Discography

Studio albums
 GB City (2011)
 Bass Drum of Death (2013)
 Rip This (2014)
 Just Business (2018)
 Say I Won’t (2023)

EPs
Stain Stick Skin (2008)
High School Roaches (2010)
Too Cold to Hold / Wait (2020)
you were right (2021)
Say Your Prayers (2022)
”Find It” (2022)

References

External links
 Band website
 Fat Possum label page
 Interview, Blare Magazine
 Bass Drum of Death Interview: Listen Now On The Culture Creature Podcast

Rock music duos
Musical groups established in 2008
American noise rock music groups
Garage rock groups from Mississippi
Fat Possum Records artists
Because Music artists